Wöller or Woller is a surname. Notable people with the surname include:

Frank E. Woller, (born 1859), Wisconsin politician
Kerstin Wöller (born 1967), German bodybuilding champion
Kirk B. R. Woller (born 1962), American actor in TV shows and movies, including Agent Gene Crane on The X-Files
Klaus Wöller (born 1956), former West German handball player who competed in the 1984 Summer Olympics
Steffen Wöller (born 1972), German luger who competed from 1991 to 2004